The modified Allan variance (MVAR), also known as mod σy2(τ), is a variable bandwidth modified variant of Allan variance, a measurement of frequency stability in clocks, oscillators and amplifiers.  Its main advantage relative to Allan variance is its ability to separate white phase noise from flicker phase noise.

The modified Allan deviation (MDEV), also known as mod σy(τ), is the deviation variant of the modified Allan variance.

Background
The Allan variance has a drawback in that it is unable to separate the white phase modulation (WPM) from the flicker phase modulation (FPM). Looking at their response to Power-law noise it is clearly seen that WPM and FPM have almost the same response to tau, but WPM is linearly sensitive to the system bandwidth fH whereas FPM is only weakly dependent on it. Thus, by varying the system bandwidth the WPM and FPM noise forms may be separated. However, it is impractical to alter the hardware of the measurement system. By post-processing the sample-series and implementing a software bandwidth a modified Allan variance measure can be given capable of resolving the noise forms.

Definition
The modified Allan variance is defined for  using time error samples as

or with average fractional frequency time series and 

where n is the integer number of samples averaged over.

Estimators
The modified Allan variance estimator for time error time series is

or with average fractional frequency time series

References

Clocks
Signal processing metrics